Place de l'Estrapade is a square in the 5th arrondissement of Paris. It is located where rue de l'Estrapade meets rue Lhomond and rue des Fossés-Saint-Jacques and marks the border between quartier du Val-de-Grâce and la Sorbonne.

It is named after the 'estrapade' or strappado inflicted there on prisoners (especially Protestants) until it was forbidden by Louis XIII of France. It has also been known as carrefour de Braque and place Neuve-de-Fourcy.

In popular culture 
Place de l'Estrapade was prominently featured in the 2020 Netflix television show Emily in Paris.

Sources

5th arrondissement of Paris
Estrapade